The Mayacamas Mountains are located in northwestern California in the United States. The mountain range is part of the Northern Inner Coast Ranges, of the California Coast Ranges System.

Geography
The Mayacamas Mountains are located south of the Mendocino Range, west of Clear Lake, and east of Ukiah in Mendocino and Lake Counties, and extend south into Napa and Sonoma Counties.

Mountains in the range include:

These peaks are sufficiently high to retain some snow cover in winter.

Several streams rise in the Mayacamas Mountains including Mark West Creek, Sonoma Creek, Calabazas Creek, Arroyo Seco Creek, Putah Creek, and Santa Rosa Creek.

Natural history

Around ten million years ago, during pre-historic times (Miocene), the mountains are thought to have been densely forested in Mendocino Cypress (Cupressus pigmaea).

The Mayacamas Mountains currently support California mixed evergreen forest and California interior chaparral and woodlands habitats.

Naming
According to Gudde:

The spelling Mayacamas is listed as an alternate name by the Board of Geographic Names.

Geothermal power
Located in the Mayacamas mountain range is The Geysers, the world's largest and most developed geothermal field. It consists of more than 22 power plants scattered across an area of about 30 square miles (78 km2). The Geysers spans the Lake, Sonoma, and Mendocino counties in California, and provides energy to those counties. 
The electrical energy is generated when dry steam is pumped from geothermal reservoirs  through turbines.

See also
Mark West Springs
Mayacamas Vineyards
Snell Valley
Natural history of the California Coast Ranges

References

External links

 
California Coast Ranges
Mountain ranges of the San Francisco Bay Area
Mountain ranges of Mendocino County, California
Mountain ranges of Lake County, California
Mountain ranges of Napa County, California
Mountain ranges of Sonoma County, California
Mountain ranges of Northern California